The 1937–38 Panhellenic Championship was the ninth season of the highest football league of Greece. The champions of the 3 founding Associations of the HFF participated in the championship, which were the Αthenian, the Piraeus' and the Macedonian association. Olympiacos emerged again undefeated champion and won the championship for their sixth time (3 consecutive), winning in the crucial last game the then champion of Athens, Apollon Athens with 2-3 after a comeback from 2-1 at the half time, at Apostolos Nikolaidis Stadium. The point system was: Win: 2 points - Draw: 1 point - Loss: 0 points.

Qualification round

Athens Football Clubs Association

Piraeus Football Clubs Association

Macedonia Football Clubs Association

Final round

League table

Top scorers

External links
Rsssf 1937–38 championship

Panhellenic Championship seasons
Greece
1937–38 in Greek football